The Treaty or Peace of Baden may refer to:
 Peace of Baden (1412), a treaty between the Swiss Confederation and Frederick IV, Duke of Austria
 Treaty of Baden (1714), between France and the Holy Roman Empire, ending the War of the Spanish Succession
 Treaty of Baden (1718), ending the Toggenburg War in Swiss cantons